Teia Miles (born 2 November 1996) is a professional Australian rules footballer who played for the Hawthorn Football Club in the Australian Football League (AFL). He is a highly rated young midfielder, with the ability to play forward or back when required, and is renowned for his endurance.

AFL career
Miles was drafted by Hawthorn with their second selection and forty-ninth overall in the 2014 national draft. In 2016, Miles played 15 matches in the Victorian Football League (VFL) for the  before a broken collarbone late in the season ended his year.

In 2018 he played the last eight games of the regular season only to be dropped for the finals campaign. He returned to Box Hill where he was an important member of the VFL premiership side.

He was delisted by Hawthorn at end of the 2019 AFL season.

Family
He is the son of former Collingwood, West Coast Eagles and Geelong player, Geoff Miles, and the cousin of former Carlton and Greater Western Sydney player, Dylan Buckley. Miles' sister is the wife of Geelong player, Mitch Duncan.

Statistics

|- style=background:#EAEAEA
| 2015 ||  || 42
| 0 || — || — || — || — || — || — || — || — || — || — || — || — || — || — || 0
|-
| 2016 ||  || 42
| 0 || — || — || — || — || — || — || — || — || — || — || — || — || — || — || 0
|- style=background:#EAEAEA
| 2017 ||  || 42
| 4 || 3 || 0 || 25 || 18 || 43 || 13 || 5 || 0.8 || 0.0 || 6.3 || 4.5 || 10.8 || 3.3 || 1.3 || 0
|-
| 2018 ||  || 42
| 8 || 2 || 0 || 89 || 46 || 135 || 33 || 17 || 0.3 || 0.0 || 11.1 || 5.8 || 16.9 || 4.1 || 2.1 || 0
|- style=background:#EAEAEA
| 2019 ||  || 42
| 0 || — || — || — || — || — || — || — || — || — || — || — || — || — || — || 0
|- class="sortbottom"
! colspan=3| Career
! 12 !! 5 !! 0 !! 114 !! 64 !! 178 !! 46 !! 22 !! 0.4 !! 0.0 !! 9.5 !! 5.3 !! 14.8 !! 3.8 !! 1.8 !! 0
|}

Honours and achievements
Team
 VFL premiership player: 2018
 Minor premiership: 2015

Individual
  leading goalkicker: 2016

References

External links

Living people
1996 births
Australian rules footballers from Victoria (Australia)
Geelong Falcons players
Box Hill Football Club players
Hawthorn Football Club players
Williamstown Football Club players